The Bachman–Wilson House, built in and originally located in Millstone, in Somerset County, New Jersey, United States, was originally designed by Frank Lloyd Wright in 1954 for Abraham Wilson and his first wife, Gloria Bachman. Ms. Bachman's brother, Marvin, had studied with Wright at Taliesin West, his home and studio in Scottsdale, Arizona. In 2014 the house was acquired by the Crystal Bridges Museum of American Art in Bentonville, Arkansas and has been relocated in its entirety to the museum's campus.

Architecture
The Bachman-Wilson house is an example of Wright's invention of Usonian architecture. Wright built many of his houses around the notion of comfortable, low-cost living that fits the needs of its residents, as well as building a structure to match its environment. Wright was determined to use his new style to reinvent the previously box-like forms of early-to-mid twentieth century architecture, and create buildings that were right for modern times, as well as engaging and exciting for people to experience in a visual sense. Wright's ideas for low-cost living originated in the early twentieth century, and Wright was able to produce a large number of designs in that time. These would eventually turn into one of the largest collections of designs done by Wright in the early twentieth century.

The house is a beautiful example of Wright's ongoing pursuit of the "destruction of the box," and gives visitors a wonderful experience with its continuous open and flowing spaces and transparency. Wright's invention of the transparent corner, which can be seen in the way the tall windows meet at a corner looking out onto the back porch area of the house, allows the interior space to have an even greater sense of openness and calm. Another architectural signature of Frank Lloyd Wright is also seen in the fireplace, as it sits in the central portion of the house, making it a sort of symbolic architectural centerpiece. While it does have many features that give a sense of open space, it also has many other interesting architectural features.

The front façade of concrete blocks has an almost fortress-like appearance to ensure privacy from the street. The house is built with Way-Lite concrete blocks and Philippine mahogany trim. It has a second story, rare in a Usonian house, with cantilevered balconies. The living room has a built-in banquette facing a wooded scene through a wall of 10 foot high glass panes, symbolizing a transcendental pew set before the altar of nature.

The public space is a dramatic focal point, with walls of glass and an open floor plan. Cut-out wooden panels of abstracted forms over 24 clerestory windows provide an unobtrusive yet restrained decorative touch to this lavish space. These recall Native American geometric motifs as well as stylized forms that may be based in nature. Construction was completed in 1956. Gloria and Abraham Wilson were the original owners of the home, and it was later bought and restored in 1988.

Sharon and Lawrence Tarantino
In 1988, Sharon and Lawrence Tarantino acquired the neglected Bachman Wilson House. Tarantino Architects has since guided the home's complete restoration and rebuilt the kitchen according to Wright's original drawings.  Sharon and Lawrence Tarantino have received several awards for their restoration work, including the Wright Spirit Award from the Frank Lloyd Wright Building Conservancy.

The house was originally located along the Millstone River in Millstone Borough. It exemplifies Wright's "Usonian" philosophy and employs his early green building principles, including minimizing the size of the house and ancillary spaces, pioneering passive solar and radiant heat design, employing natural daylight and recycling construction waste. As its location was prone to flooding, the owners sought to relocate and rebuild it at a safer site in order to preserve it.

Relocation and renovation
On January 15, 2014, the Crystal Bridges Museum of American Art in Bentonville, Arkansas, announced that it was acquiring the Bachman–Wilson House and have made plans to relocate the house in its entirety to the museum's campus. Due to its past flooding and other circumstances, not all of the original structure could be relocated, such as the exterior concrete block wall and the stained concrete flooring, both of which have been remade by Crystal Bridges' reconstruction crew for the relocation. Despite flood damage, most of the interior of the house has been saved and can be seen and toured on the grounds of Crystal Bridges.

The house is located on the south side of Crystal Bridges and is only a brief walk from the south entrance. As well as the house there is also a welcoming pavilion constructed by the Fay Jones School of Architecture from The University of Arkansas that tells visitors not only about the Bachman–Wilson House but also about Frank Lloyd Wright and his works elsewhere.

Articles
 October 14, 2001:  Memories of a Famous Architect - New York Times
 March 7, 2008:  AIArchitect This Week | For the People: Preserving Wright’s Usonian Houses
 November 21, 2008:  Frank Lloyd Wright Renovation Receives Merit Award - Inhabitat
 October 17, 2008:  Honors for Restored Wright House - New York Times
 2011:  10 Most Endangered Historic Places in New Jersey
 April 19, 2012:  A Frank Lloyd Wright House in NJ ready to deconstruct and reconstruct
 January, 14, 2014: Crystal Bridges Museum of American Art Acquire A Rare Frank Lloyd House, Preserves an architectural treasure
 February 12, 2014: Crystal Bridges Museum Acquires Frank Lloyd Wright Usonian House

See also
 Storrer, William Allin. The Frank Lloyd Wright Companion. University Of Chicago Press, 2006,  (S.366)
 Kennedy-Grant, Philip S. "AIA New Jersey Guidebook". Rutgers University Press, 2012,

References

External links
 The Bachman Wilson House
 Frank Lloyd Wright – Bachman Wilson House | Tarantino Architect
 Fay Jones and Frank Lloyd Wright: Organic Architecture Comes to Arkansas digital exhibit, University of Arkansas Libraries

Frank Lloyd Wright buildings
Houses in Somerset County, New Jersey
Houses completed in 1956
Millstone, New Jersey
Relocated buildings and structures in Arkansas
Houses in Bentonville, Arkansas
Collection of the Crystal Bridges Museum of American Art